Playa de La Hacienda is a beach in the municipality of La Línea de la Concepción, in the Province of Cádiz, Andalusia, Spain. It is a busy beach north of the city and bordered to the south with the Playa de Torrenueva and to the north with the Playa de La Alcaidesa.

References

La Línea de la Concepción
Beaches of Andalusia